"Make Me Yours Tonight" is a 2014 duet by Belgo-Canadian singer Lara Fabian and Turkish singer Mustafa Ceceli. The title, "Make Me Yours Tonight" is written by Anthony James and Yiorgos Bellapaisiotis. A bilingual English/Turkish version was also made as "Make Me Yours Tonight // Al Götür Beni" (the Turkish title meaning Take Me Away is written by Sezen Aksu). In Turkey, the Turkish version of the song reached position 1 in the physical single sales, and position 2 in the digital sales (Kral Pop Charts).

Charts

References

2014 songs
Macaronic songs
Lara Fabian songs